Stamford House is a Grade II listed house on the west side of Wimbledon Common, Wimbledon, London, built in about 1720.

Stamford House housed a "series of local vicars", and later became a school.

From 1926 to 1940, there was a theosophical community living at Stamford House, led by 
Edward Lewis Gardner (1869-1969), who was a leading member of the Theosophical Society in England, and its general secretary from 1924 to 1928.

Soldiers were billeted here during the Second World War, after which it was converted into nine flats.

References

Grade II listed buildings in the London Borough of Merton
Houses completed in 1720
Houses in the London Borough of Merton
1720 establishments in England
Grade II listed houses in London